Sonny with a Chance is the soundtrack album from the Disney Channel Original Series of the same name, released on October 5, 2010 by Walt Disney Records, during season two. It features lead vocals from American actors and singers Demi Lovato, Sterling Knight, Tiffany Thornton, and pop rock band Allstar Weekend.

The theme song, titled "So Far, So Great", was featured in Disney Channel Playlist, released on June 9, 2009, and later featured on Lovato's second studio album, Here We Go Again, as a bonus track. "Me, Myself and Time" was released as a promotional single on August 3, 2010.

Background
Four out of the nine total tracks on the soundtrack are performed by the series' star, Demi Lovato. Co-stars Tiffany Thornton and Sterling Knight each perform two tracks. Hollywood Records group Allstar Weekend appears once on the soundtrack. The theme song, "So Far, So Great", written by Aristeidis Archontis, Jeannie Lurie and Chen Neeman, was the first song from the album to be released, on January 28, 2009, days before the series premiered. It was performed in the Summer Tour 2009.

"Me, Myself and Time", performed by Lovato, was released as a promotional single on August 3, 2010, the only one from the soundtrack. It was featured in the episode "Sonny with a Song", of the second season, and was later sent to Radio Disney. It is the first track of the soundtrack, written by Antonina Armato, Tim James and Devrim Karaoglu. The song peaked at number seven on the US Billboard Bubbling Under Hot 100 Singles chart, and charted on the US Hot Digital Songs chart and in its Canadian counterpart.

Critical reception

Andrew Leahey of AllMusic believed that Tiffany Thornton and Sterling Knight "both deserve kudos for co-writing their own tunes, but that doesn't overshadow the fact that most of the material here is formulaic pop/rock, stripped of anything unique or different from other Disney albums." Leahey noted that the music was played by session musicians who were not listed within the show's credits, and wrote "it doesn't reflect well on Lovato, who has the most to lose as an aspiring musician when albums like this are released."

Commercial performance
The soundtrack debuted at number 163 on the Billboard 200, and charted for one week. It has also peaked at number 3 on the US Kid Albums and at number 8 on the US Top Soundtracks.

Track listing

Personnel 
Credits adapted from AllMusic.

 Demi Lovato – lead vocals
 Zachary Porter – lead vocals
 Cameron Quiseng – bass guitar, backing vocals
 Michael Martinez – drums, percussion
 Nathan Darmody – guitar, backing vocals
 Marshall Altman – composition, production
 Adam Anders – composition, production
 Aristeidis Archontis – mixing, production, composition
 Antonina Armato – composition, production
 Lauren Christy – composition
 Jeff Cohen – composition
 Rich Costey – mixing
 Mike Daly – vocal production, composition
 Chris DeStefano – mixing
 Dave Dooley – production
 Graham Edwards – mixing, composition
 Steve Gerdes – creative direction
 Adrian Gurvitz – composition, production
 Nikki Hassman – composition
 Tim James – mixing, composition, production
 Devrim Karaoglu – composition
 Sterling Knight – lead vocals, composition
 Jeannie Lurie – composition, production
 Brian Malouf – executive production, mixing
 Stephen Marcussen – mastering
 Chen Neeman – composition, production
 Eric Robinson – mixing
 Pamela Sheyne – composition
 Anabel Sinn – design
 Scott Spock – composition
 Tiffany Thornton – lead vocals

Charts

References

Soundtrack
2010 soundtrack albums
Television soundtracks
Walt Disney Records soundtracks